The Airwave Magic is an Austrian single-place, paraglider that was designed by Bruce Goldsmith and produced by Airwave Gliders of Fulpmes. It is now out of production.

Design and development
The Magic was designed as a competition glider.

The design progressed through several generations of models, including the Magic, Magic 2 and 3, each improving on the last. The three models are each named for their relative size.

Operational history
The designer, Bruce Goldsmith, won the 2007 Paragliding World Championships held in Manilla, New South Wales, Australia, flying an Airwave Magic FR3.

Variants
Magic 3 S
Small-sized model for lighter pilots. The glider model is DHV 2-3 certified.
Magic 3 M
Mid-sized model for medium-weight pilots. The glider model is DHV 2-3 certified.
Magic 3 L
Large-sized model for heavier pilots. The glider model is DHV 2-3 certified.

Specifications (Magic 2 M)

References

Magic
Paragliders